is a Japanese manga series written and illustrated by Shiho Takase. It has been serialized in Shogakukan's seinen manga magazine Weekly Big Comic Spirits since December 2017.

In 2022, the manga won the 67th Shogakukan Manga Award for the general category.

Media

Manga
Written and illustrated by Shiho Takase, Nigatsu no Shōsha started in Shogakukan's seinen manga magazine Weekly Big Comic Spirits on December 4, 2017. Shogakukan has collected its chapters into individual tankōbon volumes. The first volume was released on February 9, 2018. As of December 10, 2021, fourteen volumes have been released.

Volume list

Drama
A ten-episode television drama adaptation, starring Yuya Yagira as Kurōdo Kuroki, was broadcast on Nippon Television from October 16 to December 18, 2021.

Reception
The series ranked 30th on the 2020 "Book of the Year" list by Da Vinci magazine. The series won the 67th Shogakukan Manga Award in the general category, along with Don't Call it Mystery, in 2022.

References

External links
 
 

School life in anime and manga
Seinen manga
Shogakukan manga
Winners of the Shogakukan Manga Award for general manga